The Alliance of Nationalist Left Forces of the MNR (Spanish: Alianza de Fuerzas de la Izquierda Nacional del MNR, AFIN-MNR) was a leftist political party in Bolivia.

In 1980 the left-wing group split from the Revolutionary Nationalist Movement and founded the Alliance of Nationalist Left Forces of the MNR. Led by Roberto Jordán Pando. 

In 1980 elections the AFIN-MNR presented Roberto Jordán Pando as presidential candidate; he won 1.31 per cent of the vote. 

In 1984 the AFIN-MNR merged with the Leftwing Revolutionary Nationalist Movement (MNRI).

In 1985 elections the MNRI presented Roberto Jordán Pando as presidential candidate.

Notes

1980 establishments in Bolivia
1984 disestablishments in Bolivia
Defunct political parties in Bolivia
Left-wing parties in Bolivia
Nationalist parties in Bolivia
Political parties disestablished in 1984
Political parties established in 1980
Revolutionary Nationalist Movement breakaway groups